was a town located in Nakashima District, Aichi Prefecture, Japan. As of 2003, the town had an estimated population of 13,374 and a population density of 1,514.61 persons per km². The total area was 8.83 km².

On April 1, 2005, Heiwa, along with the town of Sobue (also from Nakashima District), was merged into the expanded city of Inazawa.

Dissolved municipalities of Aichi Prefecture
Inazawa